The 1887–88 Irish Cup was the eighth edition of the premier knock-out cup competition in Irish football. 

Cliftonville won the tournament for the second time, defeating Distillery 2–1 in the final. The holders Ulster were eliminated in the quarter-finals by Distillery.

Results

First round

|}

Second round

|}

Third round

|}

Fourth round

|}

Replays

|}

Semi-finals

|}

Final

References

External links
 Northern Ireland Cup Finals. Rec.Sport.Soccer Statistics Foundation (RSSSF)

Irish Cup seasons
1887–88 domestic association football cups
1887–88 in Irish association football